RWJ-51204 is an anxiolytic drug used in scientific research. It has similar effects to benzodiazepine drugs, but is structurally distinct and so is classed as a nonbenzodiazepine anxiolytic. 

RWJ-51204 is a nonselective partial agonist at GABAA receptors. It produces primarily anxiolytic effects at low doses, with sedative, ataxia and muscle relaxant effects only appearing at some 20x the effective anxiolytic dose. It was discovered by researchers at the pharmaceutical company Johnson & Johnson, but its development has been discontinued.

References 

Anxiolytics
Fluoroarenes
Ethers
Anilides
Ketones
Benzimidazoles
GABAA receptor positive allosteric modulators
Abandoned drugs